Events from the year 1810 in Germany.

Incumbents

Kingdoms 
 Kingdom of Prussia
 Monarch – Frederick William III of Prussia (16 November 1797 – 7 June 1840)
 Kingdom of Bavaria
 Maximilian I (1 January 1806 – 13 October 1825)
 Kingdom of Saxony
 Frederick Augustus I (20 December 1806 – 5 May 1827)
 Kingdom of Württemberg
 Frederick I (22 December 1797 – 30 October 1816)

Grand Duchies 
 Grand Duke of Baden
 Charles Frederick (25 July 1806 – 10 June 1811)
 Grand Duke of Hesse
 Louis I (14 August 1806 – 6 April 1830)
 Grand Duke of Mecklenburg-Schwerin
 Frederick Francis I– (24 April 1785 – 1 February 1837)
 Grand Duke of Mecklenburg-Strelitz
 Charles II (2 June 1794 – 6 November 1816)
 Grand Duke of Oldenburg
 Wilhelm (6 July 1785 –2 July 1823 ) Due to mental illness, Wilhelm was duke in name only, with his cousin Peter, Prince-Bishop of Lübeck, acting as regent throughout his entire reign.
 Peter I (2 July 1823 - 21 May 1829)
 Grand Duke of Saxe-Weimar-Eisenach
 Karl August  (1809–1815)

Principalities 
 Schaumburg-Lippe
 George William (13 February 1787 - 1860)
 Schwarzburg-Rudolstadt
 Friedrich Günther (28 April 1807 - 28 June 1867)
 Schwarzburg-Sondershausen
 Günther Friedrich Karl I (14 October 1794 - 19 August 1835)
 Principality of Lippe
 Leopold II (5 November 1802 - 1 January 1851)
 Principality of Reuss-Greiz
 Heinrich XIII (28 June 1800 – 29 January 1817)
 Waldeck and Pyrmont
 Friedrich Karl August  (29 August 1763 – 24 September 1812)

Duchies 
 Duke of Anhalt-Dessau
 Leopold III (16 December 1751 – 9 August 1817)
 Duke of Brunswick
 Frederick William (16 October 1806 – 16 June 1815)
 Duke of Saxe-Altenburg
 Duke of Saxe-Hildburghausen (1780–1826)  - Frederick
 Duke of Saxe-Coburg and Gotha
 Ernest I (9 December 1806 – 12 November 1826)
 Duke of Saxe-Meiningen
 Bernhard II (24 December 1803 – 20 September 1866)
 Duke of Schleswig-Holstein-Sonderburg-Beck
 Frederick Charles Louis (24 February 1775 – 25 March 1816)

Events 
27 April – Beethoven composes his famous piano piece, Für Elise.
16 May – Johann Wolfgang von Goethe publishes his book Zu Farbenlehre (Theory of Colours).
12 October – First Oktoberfest: Bavarian royalty invites the citizens of Munich to join the celebration of the marriage of Crown Prince Ludwig of Bavaria, to Princess Therese of Saxe-Hildburghausen.

Date unknown 

 Friedrich Krupp establishes a steel foundry in Essen.
 Germaine de Staël's study of Germany De l'Allemagne is published in Paris but suppressed by order of Napoleon.
 Brandenburger Symphoniker established.
 Prussian Staff College established.

Births 

29 January – Ernst Kummer, German mathematician (d. 1893)
24 May –  Abraham Geiger, German rabbi, founder of European Reform Judaism (d. 1874)
8 June – Robert Schumann, German composer, pianist (d. 1856)
9 June – Otto Nicolai, German composer, conductor (d. 1849)
17 July – Georg Heinrich Busse, German landscape painter and engraver (died 1868)
20 July – Leonhard Graf von Blumenthal, Prussian field marshal (d. 1908)
11 October – Anton Zwengauer, German painter (d. 1884)
7 December – Theodor Schwann, German physiologist (d. 1882)

Deaths 

23 January – Johann Wilhelm Ritter, German chemist, physicist (b. 1776)
14 March – Ludwig Timotheus Spittler, German historian (born 1752)
1 May – Christoph Meiners, German philosopher (born 1747)
19 July – Louise of Mecklenburg-Strelitz, Queen of Prussia (b. 1776)
11 November – Johan Zoffany, German-born painter (b. 1733)
2 December – Philipp Otto Runge, German painter (b. 1777)

References 

Years of the 19th century in Germany
 
Germany
Germany